Acari River may refer to several rivers in Brazil:

Brazil
 Acari River (Amazonas)
 Acari River (Minas Gerais)
 Acari River (Rio de Janeiro)

See also
 Acará River, Pará state, Brazil
 Acarai River, Pará state, Brazil
 Acuriá River, Acre state, Brazil